Simon Kachapin (born 1967 in Sigor, Kenya) is a Kenyan politician. He was the 1st governor of West Pokot County in Kenya. Kachapin is a member of the United Democratic Alliance. He was elected into office in 2013 during the Kenya general elections.

References 

1967 births
County Governors of Kenya
Kenya African National Union politicians
Living people